Sun Dandan (born 3 July 1978 or 1979 in Changchun) is a Chinese short track speed skater, who won silver medals in the 3000 m relay at the 1998 and 2002 Winter Olympics.

References

External links
 
 

1970s births
Living people
Chinese female speed skaters
Chinese female short track speed skaters
Olympic short track speed skaters of China
Olympic silver medalists for China
Olympic medalists in short track speed skating
Short track speed skaters at the 1998 Winter Olympics
Short track speed skaters at the 2002 Winter Olympics
Medalists at the 1998 Winter Olympics
Medalists at the 2002 Winter Olympics
Asian Games medalists in short track speed skating
Short track speed skaters at the 1996 Asian Winter Games
Short track speed skaters at the 1999 Asian Winter Games
Speed skaters from Changchun
Medalists at the 1996 Asian Winter Games
Medalists at the 1999 Asian Winter Games
Asian Games gold medalists for China
Asian Games silver medalists for China
Asian Games bronze medalists for China
20th-century Chinese women
21st-century Chinese women